Thomas Beach (died 1737) was a Welsh poet and wine merchant in Wrexham, Denbighshire.

Besides other poems, he published in 1737 Eugenio, or the Virtuous and Happy Life. It was inscribed to Alexander Pope. Beach had submitted the poem to Jonathan Swift in 1735, partly to receive his criticisms and partly to be recommended to Sir William Fownes, to whom the poem specially referred. Swift's reply suggested many verbal emendations, adopted by the author, but informed him that Fownes had died.

Beach committed suicide on 17 May 1737 by slashing his throat.

References

Year of birth missing
1737 deaths
18th-century Welsh businesspeople
18th-century Welsh people
18th-century Welsh poets
Welsh male poets
Wine merchants
Welsh merchants
People from Wrexham
Suicides by sharp instrument in the United Kingdom
18th-century British male writers
18th-century suicides